The 2023 UEFA Champions League final will be the final match of the 2022–23 UEFA Champions League, the 68th season of Europe's premier club football tournament organised by UEFA, and the 31st season since it was renamed from the European Champion Clubs' Cup to the UEFA Champions League. It will be played at the Atatürk Olympic Stadium in Istanbul, Turkey on 10 June 2023.

The final was originally scheduled to be played at Wembley Stadium in London, England. However, due to the postponement and relocation of the 2020 final because of the COVID-19 pandemic in Europe, the scheduled hosts for subsequent finals were shifted back a year, and the Allianz Arena in Munich was assigned the 2023 final. When the 2021 final, which had been scheduled to be played in Istanbul, also had to be relocated due to COVID-19 pandemic in Turkey, the 2023 final was given to Istanbul instead. Munich will now host the 2025 final.

The winners will earn the right to play against the winners of the 2022–23 UEFA Europa League in the 2023 UEFA Super Cup.

Venue
This will be the second UEFA Champions League final played at the Atatürk Olympic Stadium; the first was held in 2005.

Host selection

An open bidding process was launched on 22 February 2019 by UEFA to select the 2022 and 2023 UEFA Champions League final venues. Associations had until 22 March 2019 to express interest, and bid dossiers had to be submitted by 1 July 2019.

While the bidding associations have not been confirmed by UEFA, the German Football Association was reported to have bid with the Allianz Arena in Munich, should they not be awarded the 2021 final.

The Allianz Arena was selected by the UEFA Executive Committee during their meeting in Ljubljana, Slovenia on 24 September 2019, where the hosts for the 2021 and 2023 UEFA Champions League finals were also appointed.

On 17 June 2020, the UEFA Executive Committee announced that due to the postponement and relocation of the 2020 final, Munich would instead host the 2023 final. However, because of the relocation of the 2021 final from Istanbul, they would host the 2023 final. Munich would host the 2025 final instead.

Pre-match

Identity 
The visual identity of the 2023 UEFA Champions League final was unveiled at the group stage draw in Istanbul on 25 August 2022.

Ambassador 
The ambassador for the final is former Turkish international Hamit Altıntop, who was originally the ambassador for 2020 and 2021 finals before both matches were relocated to Lisbon and Porto respectively.

Opening ceremony 
Nigerian singer Burna Boy will perform for the opening ceremony before the start of the match.

Match

Details
The "home" team (for administrative purposes) was determined by an additional draw held after the quarter-final and semi-final draws.

See also
2023 UEFA Europa League final
2023 UEFA Europa Conference League final
2023 UEFA Women's Champions League final
2023 UEFA Super Cup

Notes

References

External links

2023
Final
Scheduled association football competitions
June 2023 sports events in Europe
Sports competitions in Istanbul
International club association football competitions hosted by Turkey
2023 in Istanbul
2022–23 in Turkish football